Martyr's Monument, also known as the Martyr's Memorial, is a monument designed by Iraqi sculptor Ismail Fatah Al Turk and situated in the Iraqi capital, Baghdad. It was originally dedicated to the Iraqi soldiers who died in the Iran–Iraq War, and has since grown to become generally considered to be a commemoration of all Iraqi martyrs.

Background
Al-Shaheed was built as part of a broader Ba'athist government program to erect a number of public works intended to beautify Baghdad, help instill a sense of national pride, and at the same time immortalize Saddam Hussein's reputation as a powerful and victorious leader. It was built during the height of a period when Saddam Hussein was commissioning many artworks and spending a great deal of money on new monuments and statues.

Al-Shaheed was constructed in Baghdad's Rusafa, and this monument is one of three monuments that were built to remember Iraq's pain and suffering as a consequence of the eight-year war. The first of these structures was The Monument to the Unknown Soldier (1982); followed by Al-Shaheed (1983) and finally the Victory Arch (1989). The three monuments form a visual and metaphorical unit.

Design
Designed by the Iraqi sculptor and artist, Ismail Fatah Al Turk (1934–2004), and built in association with Iraqi architect, Saman Kamal, and the Baghdad Architecture Group, the monument was constructed between 1981 and 1983, with its official opening in 1983.

The monument consists of a circular platform 190 meters in diameter in the center of an artificial lake. On the platform sits a 40-meter tall split turquoise dome, which resembles the domes of the Abbasid era. The two halves of the split dome are offset, with an eternal flame in the middle. The outer shells are constructed of a galvanized steel frame with glazed turquoise ceramic tile cladding which was pre-cast in carbon fiber reinforced concrete. The interior is opulent, being that under the Iraqi flag, there is an open hole, or oculus, providing light below. The rest of the site consists of parks, a playground, parking lots, walkways, bridges, and the lake. 

At the centre of the two half-domes is a twisted metal flag pole emerging from the underground museum. On the pole is an Iraqi flag, apparently lightly fluttering in the breeze. When viewed from the museum below, the flag and pole appear to be floating in space. A spring of water runs nearby to symbolize the blood of the fallen. The structure includes references to Iraq's ancient art tradition in the form of a marble slab with Qu'ranic verses in ancient Kufi script.

The monument is located on the East side of the Tigris river, near the Army Canal which separates Sadr city from the rest of Baghdad. A museum, library, cafeteria, lecture hall and exhibition gallery are located in two levels underneath the domes.

On the subject of the monument's design Al-Turk made the following comments:

 

The completed monument cost half a million dollars (US). It is one of the most iconic monuments in Baghdad. The Art in America magazine rated al-Shaheed as the most beautiful design in the Middle East.

An image of the al-Shaheed monument appeared on the reverse face of the 1986 Iraqi 25 dinar bill (pictured).

Gallery
The monument creates a visual illusion: viewed from some perspectives, it appears as a single dome, but from other perspectives it appears as a split dome.

Al-Shaheed, as seen from different perspectives

See also 

 Iraqi art
 Islamic art
 One Dimension Group
 Tomb of the Unknown Soldier
 Freedom Monument

References

1983 establishments in Iraq
Buildings and structures in Baghdad
Military monuments and memorials
Monuments and memorials in Iraq
Military of Iraq
Martyrs' monuments and memorials
War monuments and memorials